Epitome is an album by the American jazz saxophonist Odean Pope recorded in 1993 and released on the Italian Soul Note label.

Reception
The Allmusic review by Al Campbell awarded the album 4 stars stating "This is a truly unique and moving ensemble, making any of their discs recommended".

Track listing
All compositions by Odean Pope except as indicated
 "Epitome" - 9:56 
 "In and Out" (Eddie Green) - 3:06 
 "Brisa" (Tyrone Brown) - 6:02 
 "Trilogy" (Brown, Pope) - 8:42 
 "Coltrane Time" (John Coltrane) - 5:34 
 "Lift Every Voice" (James Weldon Johnson, John Rosamond Johnson) - 5:04 
 "Improvo" - 3:12 
 "Gray Hair" - 4:10 
 "Terrestrial" - 7:35 
 "Zanzibar Blue" (Dave Burrell) - 5:40
Recorded at Morning Star Studio in Spring House, Pennsylvania on October 4–14, 1993

Personnel
Odean Pope, Glenn Guidone, Middy Middleton, Bootsie Barnes, Bob Howell  – tenor saxophone
Julian Pressley, Sam Reed, Robert Landham - alto saxophone
Joe Sudler - baritone saxophone 
Dave Burrell, Eddie Green – piano
Gerald Veasley – electric bass
Tyrone Brown – bass
Craig McIver – drums

References

Black Saint/Soul Note albums
Odean Pope albums
1993 albums